Mount Dzhimara or Jimara ( — Jimarayy khokh) is the second highest point of North Ossetia–Alania, a Russian republic, with an altitude of . It is located on the border between Russia and Georgia.

The mountain is located on the Khokh Range, 9 km (5.5 mi) to the west of Mount Kazbek.

See also
Geography of Georgia
Geography of Russia

References

External links
  Gora Dzhimara, Russia, GeoNames.

Dzhimara
Georgia (country)–Russia border
Four-thousanders of the Caucasus
Mountains of North Ossetia–Alania